James Harold Leslie Beck (5 January 1886 – 30 September 1961) was an Australian rules footballer who played for Carlton in the VFL during the early 1900s.

As part of a strong Carlton side he has a remarkable win loss record, losing only seven of the 60 games that he played with Carlton. Born in Gippsland, Beck spent most of his time in the back pocket and was a member of three Carlton premiership teams.

In World War One Beck joined the Australian military and fought in France. He was twice shot during the conflict but survived.

References

External links

Blueseum profile

1886 births
1961 deaths
Carlton Football Club players
Carlton Football Club Premiership players
Australian rules footballers from Victoria (Australia)
Australian military personnel of World War I
Three-time VFL/AFL Premiership players